was a Japanese-born French composer.

Biography
Yoshihisa Taïra was born in Tokyo in 1937. Initially, he studied at the Tokyo University of the Arts. He arrived in France in 1966 where he then studied at the Conservatoire de Paris. Among his teachers were André Jolivet, Henri Dutilleux and Olivier Messiaen.

He was a composition lecturer at the École Normale de Musique in Paris. Among his best-known students at École Normale were Chien-Hui Hung, Mansoor Hosseini and Malika Kishino.

Taïra died in Paris, in March 2005.

Works 
Taira's works are partially published by Éditions Musicales Transatlantiques.

Orchestra 
Hiérophonie III
Stratus for flute, harp and strings ensemble
Chromophonie
Sonomorphie III
Méditations
Trans-apparence
Erosion I for flute and orchestra
Moksa, vimoksa
Tourbillon for 6 percussionists and orchestra
Polyèdre

Chamber music 
Hiérophonie I for 4 cellos
Hiérophonie II for 15 instruments
Fusion for 2 flutists and 3 percussionists
Stratus for harp and flute
Dioptase for three strings
Radiance for solo piano and 13 instruments
Eveil for oboe and harp
Interférences I for and cellos
Clea for 12 strings
Dimorphie for 2 percussions
Fu-mon for 4 flutes
Ressac for 13 instruments
Pénombres I for 2 guitars and 12 strings
Pénombres II for double bass and piano
Synchronie for 2 flutes or flute and shakuhachi
Pénombres III for harp and small ensemble
Pénombres V for viola and piano (1996)
Pénombres VI for alto saxophone and piano
Flautissimo for 32 flutes
Aïalos for G flute and harp
Synergie for 2 double basses

Instrumental 
Sonate for violin
Sonate for viola
Sonomorphie I  for piano
Sublimation for harp
Hiérophonie IV for 4 flutes (one performer)
Maya for bass flute in C or alto flute in G
Convergence I for marimba
Convergence II for double bass
Convergence III for violin
Cadenza I for flute
Monodrame I for percussion
Monodrame II for bassoon
Monodrame III for guitar
Monodrame IV for vibraphone

External links 
Biography(Cdms)
 Yoshihisa Taira at Éditions Musicales Transatlantiques
 
 

1937 births
2005 deaths
20th-century classical composers
20th-century French composers
20th-century French male classical pianists
20th-century Japanese composers
21st-century classical composers
21st-century French composers
21st-century French male classical pianists
21st-century Japanese composers
Academic staff of the École Normale de Musique de Paris
Composers for piano
French classical composers
French male classical composers
Japanese emigrants to France
Japanese classical composers
Japanese classical pianists
Japanese male classical composers
Japanese male classical pianists
Musicians from Tokyo